Bostra gnidusalis is a moth of the family Pyralidae.

References

Moths of Asia
Moths described in 1859